JLE may refer to:

 Jewish Learning Exchange, a program run by Ohr Somayach, Jerusalem
 Journal of Lutheran Ethics, an online journal of Lutheran social theology
 Jubilee Line Extension, a line of the London Underground
 Justice League Elite, a DC Comics superhero team published 2004–2005
 Justice League Europe, a DC Comics superhero team published 1989–1994